Major-General Arthur Edmund Sandbach  (30 July 1859 – 25 June 1928) was a British Army general officer who served in the Royal Engineers and on the General Staff, eventually rising to command the 68th (2nd Welsh) and 59th (2nd North Midland) Divisions during the First World War.

Early career

Arthur Edmund Sandbach was born on 30 July 1859, the third son of Henry Robertson Sandbach of Hafodunos Hall in Denbighshire, a wealthy Anglo-Welsh landowner.

Sandbach was educated at Eton College and the Royal Military Academy, Woolwich, following which he was commissioned in the Royal Engineers as a Lieutenant on 6 April 1879. He served in the Anglo-Egyptian War of 1882, seeing action at the Battle of Tel-el-Kebir, the 1885 Sudan Campaign, the 1886–87 Burmese Expedition, and the Sikkim Expedition of 1888. He was promoted to Captain on 1 April 1889, and in 1891 served as the aide-de-camp to Major-General Elles, commanding the Hazara Expedition of 1891. He was promoted to Major in November 1897, and during the Nile Expedition of 1898 he held the post of assistant adjutant-general in the Egyptian army, where he was mentioned in despatches and appointed a brevet Lieutenant-Colonel.

On returning from Egypt at the start of 1899, Sandbach was appointed as the Military Secretary to the Viceroy of India, a post he held until November, when the outbreak of the Second Boer War meant that he was sent to South Africa. He worked on the staff in South Africa as assistant adjutant-general, for which he was awarded the Distinguished Service Order as well as a second mention in despatches.

Returning from South Africa in 1902, he married the Hon. Ida Douglas-Pennant, a daughter of George Douglas-Pennant, 2nd Baron Penrhyn, with whom he would have one daughter. In 1904, he returned again to India where he was appointed to command the 1st Sappers and Miners, the senior Indian engineer regiment. Accordingly, he was promoted to the brevet rank of Colonel in February 1904, and the substantive rank of Lieutenant-Colonel in April 1905. In 1907 he relinquished command of the 1st Sappers, and returned to England, where he was appointed Officer Commanding Royal Engineers at Aldershot and took the (partly honorary) position as chair of a Territorial Force county association. In 1910, he transferred to Irish Command as the Chief Engineer. In this post, he was given a substantive promotion to Colonel and a temporary rank of Brigadier-General.

First World War

Sandbach was still holding his post at Irish Command on the outbreak of the First World War in August 1914. While he officially remained Chief Engineer in Ireland until 5 October, he was in fact appointed to accompany the British Expeditionary Force to France, as the Commander Royal Engineers in II Corps. He was promoted to Major-General in October 1914, and with the expansion of the Expeditionary Force in early 1915, he was appointed as Chief Engineer of Second Army, but was recalled in April 1915 to act as the temporary Inspector of Royal Engineers.

In November 1915, Sandbach was appointed to command the 68th (2nd Welsh) Division, a second-line Territorial unit on home defence duties in England. He handed over command in February 1916 on his transfer to the 59th (2nd North Midland) Division, another reserve unit. The 59th was the "mobile division" in the Home Army, held in readiness to combat a landing along the East Coast; when the Easter Rising broke out in Dublin on 24 April 1916, it was ordered into immediate readiness and despatched to Ireland. Here, units of the division – many with only a few weeks' training – were hastily thrown into combat, some taking heavy casualties; the 2/7th and 2/8th Sherwood Foresters lost over two hundred men killed or wounded at Mount Street on 26 April and at the South Dublin Union on 27 April. After the end of fighting in Dublin, the 59th moved to the Curragh for further training, and was returned to England at the end of the year.

In February 1917, the 59th Division was ordered to the Western Front, despite concerns that its training schedule had been disrupted by service in Ireland. It was deployed during the Advance to the Hindenburg Line in March–April 1917, where it took unexpectedly high losses. Sandbach was relieved of command on 10 April, felt by his superiors to be too old for command of a front-line division. He was not given a further service appointment.

Following the War, Sandbach was appointed as a Justice of the Peace in Montgomeryshire, where he lived, and in 1919 served as the county's High Sheriff. He died on 25 June 1928 at 57 Manchester Street, Marylebone.

References

|-

1859 births
1928 deaths
British Army major generals
Military personnel from Denbighshire
Welsh justices of the peace
People educated at Eton College
Graduates of the Royal Military Academy, Woolwich
British Army generals of World War I
Royal Engineers officers
Companions of the Distinguished Service Order
Companions of the Order of the Bath
People from Montgomeryshire
British Army personnel of the Anglo-Egyptian War
British Army personnel of the Mahdist War
British military personnel of the Sikkim expedition